Maryadpur may refer to:
Maryadpur, Lumbini, Nepal
Maryadpur, Narayani, Nepal